The women's kumite 50 kg competition in karate at the 2017 World Games took place on 25 July 2017 at the GEM Sports Complex in Wrocław, Poland.

Results

Elimination round

Group A

Group B

Finals
{{#invoke:RoundN|N4
|widescore=yes|bold_winner=high|team-width=200
|RD1=Semifinals
|3rdplace=yes

||{{flagIOC2athlete|Miho Miyahara|JPN|2017 World Games}}|4||0
||{{flagIOC2athlete|Alexandra Recchia|FRA|2017 World Games}}|4||1

|||4|{{flagIOC2athlete|Alexandra Recchia|FRA|2017 World Games}}|6

||

References

Karate at the 2017 World Games
2017 World Games
2017 in women's karate